Khnumhotep III (sometimes simply vizier Khnumhotep) was an ancient Egyptian high steward and vizier of the 12th Dynasty.

Biography
Khnumhotep was the son of the local governor Khnumhotep II, known from his tomb at Beni Hasan (tomb BH3). Khnumhotep was promoted as a young man, under Senusret II to the royal court and was sent on several missions, one of them to the Red Sea, another one to Byblos. He became high steward and finally vizier during the reign of Senusret III.

The vizier Khnumhotep is known from inscriptions in the tomb of his father, from a stela found at the Red Sea and mainly from his mastaba at Dahshur, within the necropolis attached to the pyramid of Senusret III. The tomb was first excavated around 1894 by Jacques de Morgan who found several inscriptions as well as Khnumhotep's remains from which he estimated that the vizier should have been in his early sixties at the time of his death. New excavations after 2000 found several further biographical inscriptions, including those mentioning an expedition to Byblos and Ullaza.

Tomb
The mastaba was solid, without inner rooms, and was built of mudbricks covered with fine limestone while the outside was decorated with a palace façade and with the biographical inscription.

References

Viziers of the Twelfth Dynasty of Egypt
Ancient Egyptian high stewards
Senusret III
Ancient Egyptian overseers of the city